Cecilia Nohemí Sosa Vargas (born 7 February 1948) is a Salvadoran sprinter. She competed in the women's 100 metres at the 1968 Summer Olympics. She was the first woman to represent El Salvador at the Olympics.

References

External links
 

1948 births
Living people
Athletes (track and field) at the 1968 Summer Olympics
Salvadoran female sprinters
Salvadoran female hurdlers
Salvadoran female long jumpers
Olympic athletes of El Salvador
Sportspeople from San Salvador
20th-century Salvadoran women